This page provides supplementary chemical data on boron trioxide.

Material Safety Data Sheet  

MSDS from SIRI

Structure and properties

Thermodynamic properties

Spectral data

References 

Chemical data pages
Chemical data pages cleanup